The Red Chapel is a 2009 Danish documentary film directed by Mads Brügger. It chronicles the visit of Brügger and two Danish comedians who were adopted from South Korea, Jacob Nossell  and Simon Jul, to North Korea under the pretense of a small theatre troupe on a cultural exchange. This is also the first time the two comedians have ever visited North Korea. The entire trip is a ruse: the trio are actually trying to get a chance to portray the absurdity of the pantomime life they are forced to lead in the DPRK. The film turns deeply emotional as Jacob Nossell has spastic paralysis and North Korea has been accused of disposing of the disabled. The film won Best Nordic Documentary at Nordisk Panorama 2009 and Best Foreign Documentary at the 2010 Sundance Film Festival where it was included in the Official Selection. It is filmed and edited by René Sascha Johannsen.

The film features roughly the same contents as the 4-part documentary series Det Røde Kapel.

Synopsis
The authorities demand much control over the performance of the theatre troupe, and try to use it for propaganda purposes. The film crew plays along, but among themselves and in the voice-over they are critical of the regime.

Reception 
Los Angeles Times reviewer Mark Olson called it "shocking, funny and wildly outrageous" and "a real find".
Kyle Smith from the New York Post described it as "a clear-eyed and inspired documentary".
The New York Times reviewer Neil Genzlinger found it sloppy and thought it had "no revelations to offer".

See also
 Disability in North Korea
The Idiots, another Danish film playing on social discomfort with disability
On the Art of the Cinema, Kim Jong-il's art manifesto featured in the film

Footnotes

External links

The Red Chapel at the Sundance Film Festival website, including trailer
Review from The Hollywood Reporter
 

2009 documentary films
2009 films
Danish documentary films
Documentary films about people with disability
Documentary films about North Korea
Propaganda in North Korea
Zentropa films
Sundance Film Festival award winners
2000s Danish-language films